Murray "Ray" Bertrand Avery (28 September 1920 – 17 November 2002) was a jazz photographer and jazz record collector. He began collecting jazz recordings as a student at Big Bear Lake High School in Big Bear Lake, California. He owned Ray Avery's Rare Records in Glendale, California.

After his death, part of his collection, Approximately 63,300 78 rpm, 10-inch sound discs, were sold to the University of California, Los Angeles, Music Library.

His photographs adorn more than one hundred and fifty album covers, and have appeared on over one hundred and twenty-five CDs. His subjects included Art Blakey, Wardell Gray, Thelonious Monk, Chico Hamilton, Billie Holiday, Lord Buckley and Sonny Rollins.

References

1920 births
2002 deaths
Jazz photographers
Photographers from California
Record collectors